The 2022 World Rowing Championships were held from 18 to 25 September 2022 in Račice, Czech Republic.

Medal summary

Medal table

 Non-Olympic/Paralympic classes

Men

Women

Para-rowing

Participating nations
63 countries participated in this championship; athlete numbers are shown in brackets.

 (4)
 (2)
 (53)
 (18)
 (1)
 (7)
 (1)
 (8)
 (3)
 (33)
 (50)
 (3)
 (7)
 (4)
 (1)
 (39)
 (16)
 (8)
 (6)
 (5)
 (34)
 (1)
 (45)
 (45)
 (9)
 (7)
 (12)
 (10)
 (3)
 (24)
 (2)
 (4)
 (62)
 (2)
 (11)
 (4)
 (1)
 (17)
 (16)
 (4)
 (1)
 (42)
 (22)
 (16)
 (1)
 (30)
 (4)
 (35)
 (6)
 (2)
 (2)
 (5)
 (11)
 (24)
 (2)
 (24)
 (4)
 (5)
 (35)
 (72)
 (1)
 (8)
 (1)

 Belarusian and Russian athletes were banned as a result of the Russian invasion of Ukraine.

References

External links
Official website
World Rowing website

World Rowing Championships
World Championships
World Rowing Championships
International sports competitions hosted by the Czech Republic
Rowing competitions in the Czech Republic
World Rowing Championships